Gina Kim may refer to:
 Gina Kim (filmmaker)
 Gina Kim (golfer)